This is a timeline documenting events of Jazz in the year 1991.

Events

March
 22 – The 18th Vossajazz started in Voss, Norway (March 22 – 24).

May
 17 – The 20th Moers Festival started in Moers, Germany (May 17 – 20).
 22 – The 19th Nattjazz started in Bergen, Norway (May 22 – June 2).

July
 2 – 25th Montreux Jazz Festival started in Switzerland (July 2 – 21).
 11 – The 16th North Sea Jazz Festival started in The Hague (July 11 – 14).

August
 16 – The 8th Brecon Jazz Festival started in Brecon, Wales (April 16 – 18).

September
 20 – The 34th Monterey Jazz Festival started in Monterey, California (September 20 – 22).

Unknown date
 Carla Bley divorced Michael Mantler.
 Carla Bley was married to Steve Swallow.

Album releases

Steve Lacy: Remains
Wayne Horvitz: Bring Your Camera
John Butcher: Thirteen Friendly Numbers
Guy Klucevsek: Flying Vegetables of the Apocalypse
Michael Formanek: Extended Animation
Randy Weston: Spirits Of Our Ancestors
Bill Frisell: Where in the World?
Don Byron: Tuskegee Experiments
Marilyn Crispell: Images
Chick Corea Elektric Band: Beyond the Mask
Bobby Previte: Weather Clear, Track Fast
Music Revelation Ensemble: After Dark
Sonny Sharrock: Ask the Ages
Steve Coleman: Black Science
Joe Lovano: From the Soul
David Sanborn: Another Hand
Don Pullen: Kele Mou Bana
Terje Rypdal: Q.E.D.
Jackie McLean: Rites of Passage
Joanne Brackeen: Is It Really True
John Scofield: Meant to Be
John Patitucci: Heart of the Bass
Julius Hemphill: Fat Man and the Hard Blues
London Jazz Composers' Orchestra: Theoria
Wynton Marsalis: Blue Interlude
Marty Ehrlich: Side by Side
Tim Berne: Can't Put My Finger On It
Joanne Brackeen: Where Legends Dwell
Joey Baron: Tongue in Groove
Max Roach: To the Max
Robert Dick: Venturi Shadows
Freddie Hubbard: Temptation
Fred Hersh: Forward Motion
Steve Swallow: Swallow
Marcus Roberts: As Serenity Approaches
Steve Turre: Right There
Trilok Gurtu: Living Magic
Branford Marsalis: The Beautiful Ones Are Not Yet Born
Christy Doran: What a Band
Yellowjackets: Politics
David S. Ware: Great Bliss, Vol. 1
David S. Ware: Great Bliss, Vol. 2
Eliane Elias: A Long Story

Deaths

 January
 4
 Eddie Barefield, American saxophonist, clarinetist, and arranger (born 19091).
 Leo Wright, American alto saxophonist, flautist, and clarinetist (born 1933).
 10 – Bob Wallis, British trumpeter (born 1934).
 14 – Miles Copeland Jr., American musician (born 1916).

 February
 26 – Slim Gaillard, American singer, songwriter, pianist, guitarist, vibraphonist, and tenor saxophonist (born 1916).

 March
 3 – Sal Nistico, American tenor saxophonist (born 1938).
 15 – Bud Freeman, American tenor saxophonist, clarinetist, bandleader, and composer (born 1906).
 20 – Billy Butler, American guitarist (born 1924).
 25 – Rusty Bryant, American tenor and alto saxophonist (born 1929).
 31 – John Carter, American clarinetist, saxophonist, and flautist (born 1929).

 April
 1
 Bjarne Nerem, Norwegian tenor saxophonist, alto saxophonist, and clarinetist (born 1923).
 Jon Eardley, American trumpeter (born 1928).
 16 – Ove Lind, Swedish clarinetist (born 1926).
 19 – Barry Rogers, American trombonist (born 1935).

 May
 3 – Harry Gibson, American pianist, singer, and songwriter (born 1915).
 8 – Kenny Trimble, American trombonist (born 1919).

 June
 6 – Stan Getz, American saxophonist (born 1927).
 23 – Masayuki Takayanagi, Japanese guitarist (born 1932).
 29 – Richard Holmes, American organist (born 1931).

 July
 24 – Tullio Mobiglia, Italian saxophonist and bandleader (born 1911).
 31 – Charlie Beal, American pianist (born 1908).

 August
 4 – Jeri Southern, American pianist and singer (born 1926).
 10 – Buster Smith, American alto saxophonist (born 1904).

 September
 4 – Charlie Barnet, American saxophonist, composer, and bandleader (born 1913).
 28 – Miles Davis American trumpeter, bandleader, and composer (born 1926). 

 October
 1 – Stu Williamson, American trumpeter and valve trombonist (born 1933).

 November
 9 – Lance Hayward, Bermudan-American pianist (born 1916).

 December
 8 – Buck Clayton, American trumpeter (born 1911).
 12 – Ronnie Ross, British baritone saxophonist (born 1933).
 18 – King Kolax, American trumpeter and bandleader (born 1912).
 22 – Beaver Harris, American drummer (born 1936).
 31 – Pat Patrick, American baritone saxophonist, alto saxophonist, and guitar bassist (born 1929).

 Unknown date
 Tío Tom, Afro-Cuban musician (born 1919).

Births

 February
 4 – Kjetil Mulelid, Norwegian pianist and composer.

 April
 10 – Andreas Skår Winther, Norwegian drummer.
 23 – Jean Rondeau, French harpsichordist.
 26 – Will Heard, English singer, songwriter, and multi-instrumentalist.

 May
 10 – Jimmy Macbride, American drummer and composer.

 June
 11 – Aaron M. Johnson, American jazz saxophonist and bandleader.

 July
 26 – Nathan Hartono, Indonesian multi-instrumentalist and vocalist.

 September
 21 – Ai Kuwabara, Japanese pianist.
 25 – Per Kamfjord, Norwegian drummer.

 October
 20 – Henrik Lødøen, Norwegian drummer.

 Unknown date
 Bendik Baksaas, Norwegian electronica artist.
 Magnus Bakken, Norwegian saxophonist.
 Olli Soikkeli, Finnish guitarist.

See also

 1990s in jazz
 List of years in jazz
 1991 in music

References

External links 
 History Of Jazz Timeline: 1991 at All About Jazz

Jazz
Jazz by year